The Toronto Rowing and Athletic Association (also known as the Torontos as well as Toronto Rugby and Athletic Association) were an ORFU football team in the early 20th century. The team was founded in 1908 as Toronto Amateur Athletic Club and became the team of the Toronto Rowing and Athletic Association in 1912.  The team won the ORFU championship in 1915, 1919 and 1920.  In 1915 they played in the 7th Grey Cup, losing to the Hamilton Tigers.

MRFU season-by-season

References

Ontario Rugby Football Union teams
Canadian football teams in Toronto
Defunct Canadian football teams
1911 establishments in Ontario
Sports clubs established in 1911
1921 disestablishments in Ontario
Sports clubs disestablished in 1921